Andrew Dunn (born 12 April 1957) is an English actor, best known for the role of Tony in the BBC sitcom dinnerladies between 1998 and 2000. He later played Roger Stiles in Coronation Street from 2007 to 2008. He was born in Leeds, West Riding of Yorkshire, but was brought up in North Shields, eight miles (13 km) east of Newcastle upon Tyne, before leaving for London at the age of 20. He trained as a teacher but decided he wanted to act. He later moved to York.

Early life
He was born in Leeds, but then the family moved to North Shields when he was nine. He attended Whitehouse Primary School and then Marden High School in Cullercoats, and then Tynemouth Sixth Form College, where he became interested in drama.

Career
Dunn has appeared in numerous television series including perhaps his best known role to date, as Tony in dinnerladies. In addition he has also appeared in The Bill, Holby City, 55 Degrees North, Heartbeat, and Coronation Street in 2003. He had a lead role playing Hardy in the British feature film Between Two Women (2000) and also appeared in the British feature film The Jealous God (2005).

In December 2006 he rejoined the cast of Coronation Street as Roger Stiles, a plumber and new love interest for Janice Battersby. On 29 September 2008 it was announced he was the latest character to be axed from Corrie and he made his final appearance on 8 October 2008.

From 1999 until at least 2006, Dunn played the recurring role of Alastair Campbell in the political satire, Bremner, Bird & Fortune. Dunn reprised his role as Alastair Campbell in the BBC Radio 4 play The Iraq Dossier, written by David Morley, which was broadcast on 2 March 2013.

Dunn joined old cast members of dinnerladies in March 2009 to perform a stage version of the hit show.

Dunn received an honorary degree of letters from York St John University on 13 November 2009.

Dunn appeared in the BBC series, Doctors, 24 March 2011. He played Owain Brumpton. In September 2014, Dunn began playing the role of Gerald in the touring production of The Full Monty.

Career highlights

Film
 Mr. Right - Feature film, 2009
 Popcorn - Feature film, 2007
 The Jealous God - Feature film, 2005
 Ali G Indahouse - Feature film, 2002
 Between Two Women - Feature film, 2000

Theatre
 dinnerladies - 2009, stage adaptation of the popular BBC sitcom, York Theatre Royal and the Darlington Civic Theatre
 'Art' - 2006, York Theatre Royal
  - 2013, York Theatre Royal
 The Railway Children - 2015, Kings Cross Theatre

Television
 Doctors (2011) as Owain Brumpton
 Law & Order: UK (2010) as Martin Douglas
 My Family (2009) as Martin
 Coronation Street (2003 and 2006) as Roger Stiles
 Brief Encounters (2006, episode "Cake")
 Dalziel & Pascoe (2006)
 Blue Murder (2006)
 55 Degrees North (2004–2005) as Police Sergeant Rick Astel
 Gifted (TV, 2003)
 No Angels (2003)
 Midsomer Murders (2003, episode "The Green Man")
 Bremner, Bird and Fortune (2002) as Alistair Campbell
 dinnerladies (1998–2000) as Tony Martin
 The Knock (1994-1999) as Kevin Butcher (27 episodes) 	
 London's Burning (1992) as 'Two Rods' Eddie
 The Ritz (1987) as Skodge
Video games

 Xenoblade Chronicles 3 as Consul O

References

External links

1957 births
Living people
English male television actors
Male actors from Leeds
Actors from County Durham
People from North Shields
Male actors from Tyne and Wear